The American Parkway is an arterial street in Allentown, Pennsylvania. The street connects Allentown's central core with Pennsylvania Route 987, U.S. Route 22, and Lehigh Valley International Airport. The road existed in incomplete form in two segments for over 25 years—from center city Allentown at Hamilton Street to Front Street, and then on the east side of the Lehigh River from North Dauphin Street east to Nelson and Columbia Streets—until the completion of the American Parkway bridge on November 24, 2015.

The first two segments of the parkway were built by 1988. The bridge over the Lehigh River that was completed in 2015 was first proposed in the 1960s.

Route description

Center City Allentown Segment 
The center city segment of American Parkway extends from Hamilton Street north to North Front Street near the Lehigh River, skirting the eastern edge of Allentown’s Center City area and the valley of the Jordan Creek. Major crossings after Hamilton Street (and the Allentown Bus Terminal) are Linden Street (one-way westbound) and Gordon Street. The American Parkway passes underneath Tilghman Street without intersecting it, and follows the Jordan Creek in a northeasterly direction. along the former R.J. Corman Railroad's Allentown Line. Until November 2015, it terminated at Front Street.

Northeast Segment 
The northeast segment of American Parkway was built on former Lehigh and New England Railroad (L&NE) right-of-way. It began at North Dauphin Street (State Route 1007) above the east bank of the Lehigh River and continued to the northeast past a partial intersection with Business Park Lane and a full intersection with LSI Way and Ironpigs Way. Subsequent intersections are at Irving Street (State Route 1005) and Airport Road. American Parkway continues along the L&NE right-of-way approximately one-quarter mile to its intersection with Nelson and Columbia Streets. (Google Maps, L&NE reference)

History
The idea for a link to Center City Allentown to then-Interstate 78/Lehigh Valley Thruway (now U.S. Route 22)  dates back to the 1960s, when Interstate 178 was proposed to link from what was then Interstate 78, but was cancelled due to local opposition in 1971.  Another proposal for plans of a Route 145 alignment linking the center of the city and the Thruway were abandoned. An article in The Morning Call in late 1978 described a proposal to build an expressway beginning at Basin Street south of downtown,  passing north and east through the center city area, crossing the Lehigh River, and continuing to Airport Road (adjacent to an existing interchange with the Thruway). By 1988, the completed center city section of the "American Parkway" connected North Front Street with Hamilton Street. The northeastern section of the parkway was built at approximately the same time (~ 2001), but funding was not available to complete the city’s dream for a fast link between the Thruway and downtown Allentown.

American Parkway Bridge 
Opened in November 2015, the American Parkway bridge is approximately one mile in length and the city’s third crossing of the Lehigh River. The Tilghman Street bridge (1,660 feet in length) and Hamilton Street bridge (315 feet in length) to the south are the only other links between the eastern and western parts of the city. The Tilghman Street bridge was constructed in 1929, and the current Hamilton Street bridge was opened to traffic in 1959, and rebuilt and re-opened on June 19, 1973.

Funding and property to construct the bridge and its approaches was secured by the end of 2012, and a contract was let with New Enterprise Stone and Lime of New Enterprise, Bedford County, Pennsylvania to build the span. On December 14, 2012, Allentown's Mayor Ed Pawlowski hosted a groundbreaking ceremony at the future eastern landing of the bridge with members of City Council, United States House of Representatives member Charlie Dent, and other area elected officials and members of the public.

On November 24, 2015 at 4:00 p.m., Allentown's Mayor Pawlowski hosted the ribbon-cutting of the bridge, finally providing the long-promised link between Allentown's central core, U.S. Route 22, and Lehigh Valley International Airport. A video showing the westbound drive along the full alignment of American Parkway was published on November 30, 2015.

References

External links 
 Allentown (Pennsylvania) city press release: http://www.allentownpa.gov/Home/tabid/36/ctl/Detail/mid/1165/xmid/2090/xmfid/8/Default.aspx
 Pennsylvania Department of Transportation "open document" project description: http://www.dot.state.pa.us/penndot/Districts/District5.nsf/4a6d48b02abaf59085256a540067b74f/51657cbb55ba1938852571f4004cd887?OpenDocument
 New Enterprise Stone and Lime webpage: http://nesl.com/
 R.J. Corman Railroad Railroad Group: https://web.archive.org/web/20130322150017/http://rjcorman.com/shortlines.html

Transportation in Lehigh County, Pennsylvania
Roads in Pennsylvania